Institute for Scientific and Technical Information may refer to:

 All Union Institute for Scientific and Technical Information
 Canada Institute for Scientific and Technical Information (NRC-CISTI)
 Institut de l'information scientifique et technique, French National Centre for Scientific Research (INIST-CNRS)
 International Council for Scientific and Technical Information